G.A. Weaver Sr. was a doctor and a member of the Georgia Assembly in Thomaston, Georgia. A 1914 history of Upson County, Georgia describes him as fiery and states he let the Radical Republicans seat William Guilford before he would declare the mandated oath. Weaver was one of the founders of the Upson Banking Trust Company in 1890.

References

Year of birth missing
Year of death missing
Date of birth missing
People from Thomaston, Georgia
Members of the Georgia General Assembly
Physicians from Georgia (U.S. state)